Guðmundur Ingi Guðbrandsson (born 28 March 1977) is a member of parliament Alþingi in Iceland and the Minister of Social Affairs and the Labour Market since November 28, 2021. He represents the Left-Green Party. He was Minister for the Environment and Natural Resources from November 30, 2017 to November 28, 2021. He has also served as the CEO of Landvernd, the largest nature conservation and environmental NGO in Iceland, from 2011 to 2017. In 2017 he became the first openly gay man to become an Icelandic Minister.

Education and Career 
Guðmundur was raised on a farm. His intention was to be a sheep farmer. When he went to a secondary school in Akureyri he started acting and was interested in becoming an actor, but found out that he didn’t sing well enough. After graduation he went to the Reykjavik household school and then travelled to Germany, where he stayed in a convent for a few months. He found out eventually that his faith was not strong enough to be a monk. 
Guðmundur holds a BSc degree in biology from the University of Iceland and a master's degree in environmental science from Yale University. He has worked with research in ecology and environmental studies at the University of Iceland and at The Soil Conservation Service of Iceland. He then worked at The Institute of Freshwater Fisheries in Hólar in Hjaltadalur. Since 2006 he has been a part-time teacher at the University of Iceland, the Agricultural University of Iceland and the University Center of the Westfjords. He has also worked as a ranger in Þingvellir National Park and Vatnajökull National Park.

He was one of the founders of The Icelandic Association of Environmentalist and was the first chairman from 2007 to 2010. In 2011 he became the CEO of Landvernd, an Icelandic environment association. He served as CEO of Landvernd for 6 years.

References

External links 
 Biography of Guðmundur Ingi on the parliament website (Icelandic)

Gudbrandsson, Gudmundur Ingi
Gudbrandsson, Gudmundur Ingi
Icelandic LGBT politicians
Gudbrandsson, Gudmundur Ingi
Environment ministers of Iceland